Mark Christopher Butler (born 8 July 1970) is an Australian politician. He is a member of the Australian Labor Party (ALP) and has served in the House of Representatives since 2007. He was a minister in the Gillard and Rudd Governments and also served as national president of the ALP from 2015 to 2018.

Butler studied arts and law at the University of Adelaide and international relations at Deakin University. Prior to entering parliament he was the South Australian secretary of the Liquor, Hospitality and Miscellaneous Union (LHMU). He was elected to the seat of Port Adelaide at the 2007 federal election, later switching to Hindmarsh in 2019. Butler was made a parliamentary secretary in 2009, becoming a minister after the 2010 election and winning promotion to cabinet the following year. He subsequently held the portfolios of Minister for Mental Health and Ageing (2010–2013), Social Inclusion (2011–2013), Housing and Homelessness (2013), Environment and Water (2013), and Climate Change (2013).

After the ALP's defeat at the 2013 election, Butler was a member of shadow cabinet under opposition leaders Bill Shorten and Anthony Albanese. He is a senior member of the Labor Left faction and was elected to a three-year term as national president in 2015.

After the ALP’s win at the 2022 Australian federal election, Butler has held the portfolio of Minister for Health and Aged Care and is the Deputy Leader of the House.

Early life 
Butler was born in Canberra on 8 July 1970, the son of Lindsay Nicholson and David Butler. His mother was a peace and anti-nuclear activist and campaigned to elect the Hawke and Keating governments. His father, a public servant and Vietnam conscript, was the grandson of conservative South Australian premier Richard Layton Butler, but was not politically active himself.

Butler's parents divorced when he was five years old, after which he and his brother moved to Adelaide with their mother. He attended Unley High School, taking a gap year in Italy before enrolling at the University of Adelaide. He graduated with a Bachelor of Arts in Jurisprudence and a Bachelor of Laws with first class honours. While at university he worked as a paralegal at Duncan Basheer Hannon (DBH). He was short-listed for a Rhodes Scholarship, and later completed a Master of International Relations degree at Deakin University.

Butler was active in student politics while at university. He was a housemate of future state MP Patrick Conlon and developed friendships with future premier Jay Weatherill and future federal minister Penny Wong; he and Weatherill were best man at each other's weddings.

Trade union career 
In 1992, Butler joined the Liquor Hospitality and Miscellaneous Workers' Union (LHMU) as a legal officer through his connections with Conlon. He made appearances before industrial tribunals, "pushing for cleaners and hospital workers to get better pay". In 1996 he was elected state secretary of the LHMU, winning by a single vote.

Butler developed a close working relationship with his NSW counterpart Anthony Albanese. He would later be Albanese's campaign manager in the October 2013 election for the Federal ALP Leadership. He was also noted for his constructive relationship with the Labor Right faction in South Australia, particularly then-secretary of the Shop, Distributive and Allied Employees Association, Don Farrell.

Political career
Butler joined the ALP at a young age and became a delegate to state conference in South Australia in 1993. At the age of 23, he was a candidate for ALP preselection in the seat of Ross Smith prior to the 1993 South Australian state election. He subsequently was preselected for the seat of Hanson prior to the 1997 state election, but resigned to become state secretary of the LHMU. Butler served as state president of the Australian Labor Party (South Australian Branch) from 1997 to 1998, the youngest president in the party's history. He was elected as a delegate to national conference in 1998 and elected to the national executive in 2000, representing the Left faction.

Government (2007–2013)

Butler was elected as the Labor member for the electoral division of Port Adelaide at the 2007 federal election.

In a 2009 First Rudd Ministry reshuffle, Butler was appointed Parliamentary Secretary for Health. On 14 September 2010, he was sworn in as Minister for Mental Health and Ageing in the Second Gillard Ministry. On 12 September 2011 he was given the additional responsibility of Minister Assisting the Prime Minister on Mental Health Reform. On 14 December 2011, Butler's ministry was renamed Mental Health and Aged Care, and he became a member of Cabinet.

Opposition (2013–2022)

After the 2013 election, Bill Shorten named Butler as the Shadow Minister for the Environment.

On 17 June 2015, Butler was elected National President of the Australian Labor Party and was succeeded by Wayne Swan on 18 June 2018, becoming senior vice-president to Swan.

In a Shadow Cabinet reshuffle on 28 January 2021, Butler was moved from shadow Climate Change spokesperson to shadow spokesperson for Health.

Government (2022–present)
At the 21 May 2022 election, Butler was elected for Labor in the expanded seat of Hindmarsh which included most of the area of the former seat of Port Adelaide, which had been abolished as part of the 2018 boundary redistribution.

In the incoming Albanese ministry Butler was appointed as Minister for Health and Aged Care.

Personal life
Butler has two children from a previous marriage and one from his second marriage. In 2021, he married former SBS, BBC World News and ABC journalist Daniela Ritorto. Butler supports the Port Adelaide Football Club. Butler is a pescetarian.

See also
 First Rudd ministry
 First Gillard ministry
 Second Gillard ministry
 Second Rudd ministry
 Albanese ministry

References

External links
Official website. Retrieved 25 February 2019.
Parliamentary Profile: Australian Parliament website
Parliamentary Profile: Labor website
Summary of parliamentary voting for Mark Butler MP on TheyVoteForYou.org.au

	

 

1970 births
Living people
Australian Labor Party members of the Parliament of Australia
Members of the Australian House of Representatives
Members of the Australian House of Representatives for Port Adelaide
Members of the Australian House of Representatives for Hindmarsh
Politicians from Adelaide
Australian people of English descent
Government ministers of Australia
Members of the Cabinet of Australia
Labor Left politicians
21st-century Australian politicians
Albanese Government